The Kew-Forest School is an independent, co-ed, college preparatory school for students in grades Pre-Kindergarten-Grade 12. The school was established in 1918 primarily for residents of Forest Hills and Kew Gardens, Queens, New York.

Notable alumni
 Hank Azaria, actor
 Maryanne Trump Barry, retired United States Appellate Judge and eldest sister of Donald Trump
 Peter Brant, industrialist
 Margaret Wise Brown, author
 Derek Bryson Park, Director of the Federal Home Loan Bank of New York
 Donald Trump, media personality and businessman who served as the 45th president of the United States
 Katharine Weber, author and professor
 Gideon Yago, journalist

References

External links
Official website

Private elementary schools in Queens, New York
Private middle schools in Queens, New York
Private high schools in Queens, New York
Private K-12 schools in New York City
Educational institutions established in 1918
Preparatory schools in New York City